Sebastian Garro y Sidrac  (14??–15??) was a Basque nobleman, Viscount of Zolina, Lord of Rocafort and Sidrac.

Biography 

Sebastian Garro was born in Navarra, son of a noble family. He was married to María de Gongora, daughter of an eminent Spanish family, descendants of the Marquises of Góngora. Garro was a possible descended of Pere Arnaut de Garro, a noble knight, who served in the court of Charles II of Navarre.

References

External links 
navarchivo.com

16th-century deaths
15th-century nobility from the Kingdom of Navarre
16th-century nobility from the Kingdom of Navarre
Burials at Pamplona Cathedral